Nizar Mohamed Naeeli (born 28 May 1976) is a Libyan taekwondo practitioner. He competed in the men's 68 kg event at the 2000 Summer Olympics.

References

1976 births
Living people
Libyan male taekwondo practitioners
Olympic taekwondo practitioners of Libya
Taekwondo practitioners at the 2000 Summer Olympics
Place of birth missing (living people)